The National Congress of American Indians (NCAI) is an American Indian and Alaska Native rights organization. It was founded in 1944 to represent the tribes and resist federal government pressure for termination of tribal rights and assimilation of their people. These were in contradiction of their treaty rights and status as sovereign entities. The organization continues to be an association of federally recognized and state-recognized Indian tribes.

History

Historically the Native Americans of North America rarely joined forces across tribal lines, which were divisions related to distinct language and cultural groups. One reason was that most tribes were highly decentralized, with their people seldom united around issues.

In the 20th century, a generation of Native Americans came of age who were educated in multi-tribal boarding schools. They began to think with a broad pan-Native American vision, and they learned to form alliances across tribes. They increasingly felt the need to work together politically in order to exert their power in dealing with the United States federal government. In addition, with the efforts after 1934 to reorganize tribal governments, activists believed that Indians had to work together to strengthen their political position. Activists formed the National Congress of American Indians to find ways to organize the tribes to deal in a more unified way with the US government. They wanted to challenge the government on its failure to implement treaties, to work against the tribal termination policy, and to improve public opinion of and appreciation for Indian cultures.

The initial organization of the NCAI was done largely by Native American men who worked for the Bureau of Indian Affairs (BIA), and represented many tribes. Among this group was D'Arcy McNickle of the BIA.  At the second national convention, Indian women attended as representatives in numbers equal to the men. The convention decided that BIA employees should be excluded from serving as general officers or members of the executive committee.  The first president of the NCAI was Napoleon B. Johnson, a judge in Oklahoma. Dan Madrano (Caddo) was the first  secretary-treasurer; he also had been serving as an elected member of the Oklahoma State Legislature. From 1945 to 1952, the executive secretary of the NCAI was Ruth Muskrat Bronson (Cherokee), who established the organization's legislative news service. Bronson's work was largely voluntary, as the organization could not afford to pay her to act as its executive secretary.

In 1950 John Rainer became the first paid executive director of NCAI. He was replaced by Bronson in 1951, who resigned in 1952. Frank George, a Nez Perce from the Colville Indian Reservation, briefly held the post before Helen Peterson (Cheyenne-Lakota) took over the post as the executive director of the organization in 1953. That same year, W. W. Short replaced Johnson as president of NCAI. In 1954, Short was replaced by Joseph Garry (Coeur d'Alene), a veteran of both World War II and the Korean War. Garry significantly enlarged the organizational direction away from its focus on issues of Native Americans in the Great Plains and the Southwest, making it more inclusive of tribes in the Midwest and Northwest.

In 1966, the NCAI mustered nearly 80 tribal leaders from 62 tribes to protest their exclusion from a US-Congress sponsored conference on reorganizing the BIA (Bureau of Indian Affairs). The Congressional event was organized by Morris Udall, chairman of the House Committee on Interior and Insular Affairs, to discuss the reorganization of the Bureau of Indian Affairs. Udall eventually allowed the NCAI representatives to attend. He confirmed that a group composed of tribe members, called the Tribal Advisory Commission, would be created to advise him. 

During the late 20th century, NCAI contributed to gaining legislation to protect and preserve Indian culture, including NAGPRA. They worked with the tribes to assert their sovereignty in dealing with the federal government.

In the early 21st century, key goals of the NCAI are:
 Enforce for Indians all rights under the Constitution and laws in the United States;
 Expand and improve educational opportunities provided for Indians;
 Improve methods for finding productive employment and developing tribal and individual resources;
 Increase number and quality of health facilities;
 Settle Indian claims equitably; and
 Preserve Indian cultural values.
On November 3, 2009, the Embassy of Tribal Nations was opened in Washington D.C. The building serves as a headquarters and central meeting place for the NCAI.

In 2013, the NCAI passed a resolution to establish a National American Indian Holocaust Museum space inside a museum of the Smithsonian Institution. However, the Smithsonian has been uncooperative.

In 2017, the NCAI took over the assets of the Indian Country Media Network, which were donated by the Oneida Nation of New York. In March 2021, the publication became independent from the NCAI. “This is an exciting time for Indian Country Today to become fiscally independent and to continue its tradition of an autonomous free press," NCAI President Fawn Sharp
said in a press release regarding the change. “This is a new day for ICT, which has a long history as a premier source of news for and about Indigenous communities, written and produced by Indigenous journalists.” The publication's current president and CEO is Karen Michel, Ho Chunk.

Constitution
The NCAI Constitution says that its members seek to provide themselves and their descendants with the traditional laws, rights, and benefits.  It lists the by-laws and rules of order regarding membership, powers, and dues.  There are four classes of membership: tribal, Indian individual, individual associate, and organization associate.  Voting right is reserved for tribal and Indian individual members.  According to section B of Article III regarding membership, any tribe, band or group of American Indians and Alaska Natives shall be eligible for tribal membership provided it fulfills the following requirements
 A substantial number of its members reside upon the same reservation or (in the absence of a reservation) in the same general locality.
 It maintain a Tribal organization, with regular officers and the means of transacting business and arriving at a reasonably accurate count of its membership;
 It is not a mere offshoot or fraction of an organized Tribe itself eligible for membership
 It is recognized as a Tribe or other identifiable group of Native Americans by the Department of the Interior, Court of Claims, the Indian Claims Commission, or a State. An Indian or Alaska Native organization incorporated/chartered under state law is not eligible for tribal membership.

Organization
The organizational structure of the National Congress of American Indians includes a General Assembly, an Executive Council, and seven  committees. The executive board of the NCAI is as follows:
 President: Fawn Sharp of the Quinault Indian Nation
 First Vice President: Mark Macarro
 Secretary: Stephen Roe Lewis
 Treasurer: Shannon Holsey

In addition to these four positions, the NCAI executive board also consists of twelve area vice-presidents and twelve alternative area vice-presidents.

The current chief executive officer of the National Congress of American Indians is Dante Desiderio who filled the position in 2021 after Kevin Allis, member of the Forest County Potawatomi Community in Wisconsin, exited.

Chuck Trimble was the former chief executive.

Voting 
Every tribe gets a number of votes allocated to them specific to the size of each tribe.

Achievements
The NCAI has maintained a policy of non-protesting. During the 1960s NCAI carried a banner with the slogan, "INDIANS DON'T DEMONSTRATE".
 In 1949, the NCAI made charges against Federal job bias towards the Indians
 In 1950, the NCAI influenced the insertion of an anti-reservation clause to the Alaska Statehood Act. This clause removes the ban against reservations for Alaskan Natives.
 On July 8, 1954, NCAI won their fight against legislation that would have allowed the states to take civil and criminal jurisdictions over Indians.
 On June 19, 1952, a self-help parley was opened in Utah where 50 agents for 12 groups proposed several self-help action plans
 Indians had conventions nationwide and dealt with various topics such as health care, employment, and safety issues
 In 2015 the organization successfully lobbied the State of California to ban the term "redskins" from being used by public schools in the state of California.

Internal policy differences
In the early 1960s, a shift in attitude occurred. Many young American Indians branded the older generation as sell-outs and called for harsh militancy. Two important militant groups were born: the American Indian Movement (AIM) and the National Indian Youth Council (NIYC). The two groups protested several conventions.

Ongoing issues

The NCAI has been advocating for improved living conditions on reservations, arguing that 560 tribes are federally recognized but fewer than 20 tribes gain profits from casinos to turn the tribe's economy around.   According to the NCAI website, other issues and topics include:
 Protection of programs and services to benefit Indian families, specifically targeting Indian Youth and elders
 Promotion and support of Indian education, including Head Start, elementary, post-secondary and Adult Education
 Enhancement of Indian health care, including prevention of juvenile substance abuse, HIV-AIDS prevention and other major diseases
 Support of environmental protection and natural resources management
 Protection of Indian cultural resources and religious freedom rights
 Promotion of the Rights of Indian economic opportunity both on and off reservations, including securing programs to provide incentives for economic development and the attraction of private capital to Indian Country
 Protection of the Rights of all Indian people to decent, safe and affordable housing.
 Spreading of state-specific information on voter ID requirements through its partnership with the non-partisan VoteRiders organization.

In 2001, the advertising firm of DeVito/Verdi created an advertising campaign and poster for the NCAI to highlight offensive and racist sports team images and mascots. In October 2013, the NCAI published a report on sports teams using harmful and racial "Indian" mascots.

Notable members
 Ruth Muskrat Bronson, Executive Director (1944–48) and a specialist in American Indian Affairs
 Vine Deloria, Jr., Executive Director (1964–1967).  He ended major legislative battles
 Susan Shown Harjo, Executive Director (1984–1989)
 J. B. Milam: founding member
 Ira Hayes: American hero during the battle of Iwo Jima, and also made a speech in the congress.
 Nipo T. Strongheart performer-lecturer and technical advisor on several Hollywood films involving Native Americans and a cofounder.

Past leadership

See also
 Society of American Indians

References

Bibliography
 National Congress of American Indians: Constitution, By-Laws and Standing Rules of Order. Found on the official NCAI website, this article was last amended in 2007. It states the purpose of the NCAI, the different types of memberships, and the rules and regulations.

 Deloria, Vine Jr. Custer Died for Your Sins: An Indian Manifesto.  New York: Avon Books, 1970. This book explores the reality and myths surrounding Indians, the problems of leadership, and modern Indian affairs.
 Johnson, N B. The National Congress of American Indians. Written by the Justice of Supreme Court of Oklahoma and published in the Chronicles of Oklahoma, this article discusses the formation of the NCAI, and Congress'reaction.
 Report of Activities, American Association on Indian Affairs, June 1945-May 1946. This article discusses the reasons why a nationwide organization of Indians is so crucial.
 Shreve, Bradley G. “From Time Immemorial: The Fish-in Movement and the Rise of the Intertribal Activism”, Pacific Historical Review 78.3 (2009): 403-434, via JSTOR
 Cowger, Thomas W. The National Congress of American Indians: The Founding Years. Lincoln, NE: University of Nebraska Press, 1999.

External links
 
 

Native American rights organizations
Organizations established in 1944
Organizations based in Washington, D.C.